Jack 2 is a test well in the deep waters of the Gulf of Mexico (Walker Ridge Block 758) that successfully extracted oil from the Paleogene area of the Gulf in the second quarter of 2006. At the time, it was the deepest ever successful test well in the Gulf of Mexico to date. Jack 2 is a joint venture between Chevron Corporation (50%), Devon Energy (25%), and StatoilHydro (25%).

Jack 2 proved the existence of a new play in the deepwater Gulf of Mexico. News of the find was credited for contributing to a drop in crude oil prices. The maximum estimate of  represents half of the total current estimate of U.S. reserves, equal to slightly less than two years of U.S. consumption at present levels.

References

See also
Offshore oil and gas in the US Gulf of Mexico

Gulf of Mexico oil fields of the United States
Equinor oil and gas fields
Chevron Corporation oil and gas fields